This article is a list of diseases of hazelnut (Corylus avellana & Corylus spp.).

Bacterial diseases

Fungal diseases

Viral diseases

Phytoplasmal and spiroplasmal diseases

Miscellaneous diseases and disorders

References 

 Common Names of Diseases, The American Phytopathological Society

Hazelnut
 List